Propebela svetlanae is a species of sea snail, a marine gastropod mollusk in the family Mangeliidae.

Description
The length of the shell varies between 7 mm and 11 mm.

Distribution
This species occurs in the Okhotsk Sea.

References

 Bogdanov, IP. "7 New Species of Subfamily Oenopotinae from the Okhotsk Sea." Zoologichesky Zhurnal 68.11 (1989): 147–152.

External links
 

svetlanae
Gastropods described in 1989